APA Group may refer to:

APA Group (Australia), natural gas pipeline and electricity company
APA Group (Japan), a hotel group

See also
APA (disambiguation)